George J. Schmitt House located at 7120 Ohio River Boulevard in Ben Avon, Allegheny County, Pennsylvania, was built in 1916.  The house, designed by Janssen & Abbott, was added to the List of Pittsburgh History and Landmarks Foundation Historic Landmarks in 2003.

References

Houses in Allegheny County, Pennsylvania
Houses completed in 1916
Pittsburgh History & Landmarks Foundation Historic Landmarks